Robert J. Sutherland (born 1958 or 1959) is an American politician serving as a member of the Washington House of Representatives for the 39th district.

Background
Sutherland was born and raised in Burbank, California. After graduating from high school, Sutherland served in the United States Air Force. Sutherland then earned a Bachelor of Science degree in biochemistry from Gonzaga University.

Career 
Prior to entering politics, Sutherland worked as a biochemist, specializing in the development of cancer therapies.

Sutherland sought election to the Washington's 1st congressional district in the United States House of Representatives in 2014 and 2016. He lost both elections to incumbent Congresswoman Suzan DelBene.

After the retirement of Representative Dan Kristiansen, Sutherland sought election to Washington's House of Representatives. In 2018, he defeated Democrat Ivan Lewis.

Reaction to 2020 presidential election

Shortly after Joe Biden defeated Donald Trump in the 2020 presidential election, Sutherland falsely claimed that Democrats "cheated" and that the election was not "fair". Since the 2020 elections, Sutherland has promoted false claims of widespread election fraud and conspiracy theories. In the aftermath of the 2020 presidential election, Sutherland told his followers on Facebook to "Prepare for war" after proclaiming that "Joe Biden is not now, nor will ever be my President". He also said it would be "righteous" if Donald Trump utilized the military to forcefully stay in power.

In June 2021, Sutherland visited Phoenix, Arizona to tour the controversial Arizona audit. Afterwards, Sutherland expressed support for the audit and suggested a similar audit take place in Washington state. He also claimed there was potential errors on tens of thousands of ballots cast in the 2020 Washington election. Sutherland was criticized by Secretary of State Kim Wyman for his understanding of state and national elections, saying that there's already safeguards to prevent fraud, that there's no proof of widespread fraud in the state or national elections, and that the Arizona audit has no standards for a forensic audit of elections, and that Cyber Ninjas, the company conducting the work in audit, has no prior experience with audits.

In early August 2021, Sutherland visited South Dakota to attend a symposium organized by MyPillow CEO Mike Lindell, known for promoting false claims of fraud about the 2020 presidential election. He was one of three Washington legislators to attend the event using reimbursed funds from the state legislature's annual travel allotment for events "connected to their legislative work".

On August 15, Sutherland and four other Washington Republican lawmakers held an unofficial hearing with the aim of having people testify about alleged voting irregularities and possibly calling for a "forensic audit" to take place in Washington State similar to the criticized Arizona audit. Sutherland admitted that since Republicans are a minority in the state legislature, they can't force a audit but stated "The people themselves must rise up after hearing the evidence and the data." However, these efforts have not won any support from top Republicans in the state. Sutherland later emailed attendees to encourage them to participate in a September lawsuit that alleged that auditors in Whatcom, Snohomish, and Clark counties manipulated ballots, among other allegations surrounding the elections. The lawsuit sought to establish a forensic audit for the state's 2020 elections.

Personal life 
Sutherland and his wife, Donna, have four children. They live in Snohomish County, Washington.

References

1950s births
Year of birth uncertain
Living people
Republican Party members of the Washington House of Representatives
21st-century American politicians